Beth Shalom, formally Beth Shalom B'nai Zaken Ethiopian Hebrew Congregation, is a Black Hebrew Israelite synagogue in Chicago, Illinois. The congregation leader is Rabbi Capers Funnye. Assistant rabbis are Avraham Ben Israel and Joshua V. Salter. Beth Shalom is affiliated with the International Israelite Board of Rabbis.

The congregation, which has about 200 members, is mostly African American. The congregation was started by Rabbi Horace Hasan from Bombay, India, in 1918 as the Ethiopian Hebrew Settlement Workers Association, and was influenced by Wentworth Arthur Matthew's Commandment Keepers.

Along with African-Americans, members include Hispanics and whites who were born Jews, as well as former Christians and Muslims. As is traditional with Judaism, they do not seek converts, and members must study Judaism for a year before undergoing a traditional conversion requiring men to be ritually circumcised and women to undergo ritual immersion in a mikvah.

The congregation is "somewhere between Conservative and Modern Orthodox" with distinctive African-American influences; while men and women sit separately as in Orthodox synagogues, a choir sings spirituals to the beat of a drum. It follows traditional Jewish liturgy and laws, including Sabbath and "a modified version of kosher dietary laws".

The congregation is currently housed in a former synagogue purchased from the Lawn Manor Hebrew Congregation, a Conservative temple of Ashkenazi Lithuanian Jews at West 66th Street and South Kedzie Avenue in the Marquette Park neighborhood on Chicago's South Side.

References

External links
 
 Voices on Antisemitism Interview with Rabbi Capers Funnye, Jr. from the United States Holocaust Memorial Museum

African-American history in Chicago
African American–Jewish relations
African-American Judaism
Black Hebrew Israelites
International Israelite Board of Rabbis
Jewish organizations established in 1918
Synagogues in Chicago